Beumer may refer to:

People
Beumer is a Dutch surname. Notable people with the name include:

 Antoinette Beumer (born 1962), Dutch film director
 Jürgen Marcus, (born Jürgen Beumer in 1948), German singer
 Marcel Beumer (born 1969), Dutch track cyclist 
 Marjolein Beumer (born 1966), Dutch actress
 Toos Beumer (born 1947), Dutch swimmer

Dutch-language surnames

Companies
 briefly the Beumer Group, a manufacturer of conveyor systems in intralogistics